Paper doll is a figure cut out of paper.

Paper doll or paper dolls may also refer to:

Music
"Paper Doll" (The Mills Brothers song), 1943
"Paper Doll" (P.M. Dawn song), 1991
"Paper Doll" (Fleetwood Mac song), 1992
"Paper Dolls", a 2000 song by Kylie Minogue released as a B-side to her single "Spinning Around"
"Paper Doll", a 2013 song by John Mayer from Paradise Valley
Paperdoll (EP), an EP by the heavy metal band Kittie

Bands
Paper Dolls (band), a British female vocal trio of the late 1960s
Paperdoll (band), an indie-pop band from New York City

Books
Paper Doll (novel), a novel by Robert B. Parker
The Paper Dolls, a 1964 novel by L. P. Davies

The Paper Dolls, a children's book by Julia Donaldson

Movies and TV
Paper Dolls (film), a 2006 Israeli documentary film
Paper Doll (film), a 2003 American film
Paper Dolls, a 1982 TV movie and 1984 soap opera on ABC

Gaming
Paper doll (video games), a common way of displaying a character's inventory